The third inauguration of Ferdinand E. Marcos as the tenth president of the Philippines and that saw Ferdinand Marcos inaugurated for the third time took place on June 30, 1981, at the Quirino Grandstand in Manila, making it the first Philippine presidential inauguration to take place on June 30. The inauguration had then U.S. Vice President George H. W. Bush, Singaporean Prime Minister Lee Kuan Yew, future President of China Yang Shangkun and Thai Prime Minister Prem Tinsulanonda in attendance. This is when Bush made the infamous praise for Marcos: "We love your adherence to democratic principles and to the democratic process." The inauguration ceremonies started at 6:50 AM to avoid the heat and afternoon rains. The inauguration was also televised live.

References

Presidency of Ferdinand Marcos
Marcos 3
1981 in the Philippines